Adrienn Tóth (born 24 November 1990) is an athlete of modern pentathlon for Hungary. She won several medals at the World and European Championships. Tóth competed at the 2012 Summer Olympics.

References

External links
 

1990 births
Living people
Hungarian female modern pentathletes
Olympic modern pentathletes of Hungary
Modern pentathletes at the 2012 Summer Olympics
World Modern Pentathlon Championships medalists